Leuconia is a genus of calcareous sponges in the family Baeriidae. It was described by English anatomist and zoologist Robert Edmond Grant in 1833.

Species
The following species of Leuconia are accepted in the World Porifera database:
Leuconia alaskensis de Laubenfels, 1953
Leuconia dura (Hozawa, 1929)
Leuconia gladiator (Dendy, 1893)
Leuconia johnstoni Carter, 1871
Leuconia joubini (Topsent, 1907)
Leuconia nivea (Grant, 1826)
Leuconia ochotensis (Miklucho-Maclay, 1870)
Leuconia usa (de Laubenfels, 1942)

Several other species formerly treated as part of Leuconia have been transferred to other genera, primarily Leucandra.

References

Calcaronea
Sponge genera